Dream is a 2008 South Korean film directed by Kim Ki-duk.

It is the fifteenth feature film by the director.

Plot 
Jin awakes from a dream where he causes a traffic accident to find that the accident actually took place. The police suspect a woman, Ran, though she denies any involvement as she was asleep the whole time. It transpires that while Jin dreams, Ran acts out those dreams in her sleep.

Cast 
 Joe Odagiri as Jin
 Lee Na-young as Ran
 Park Ji-a as Jin's former lover
 Kim Tae-hyun as Ran's former lover
 Lee Joo-seok as traffic police officer
 Han Gi-joong as violent crimes police officer
 Lee Ho-yeong as crime scene police officer
 Kim Min-su as crime scene police officer
 Chang Mi-hee as a doctor

Release 
Dream was released in South Korea on 9 October 2008, and on its opening weekend was ranked sixth at the box office with 39,042 admissions. As of 16 November, the film had received a total of 88,482 admissions, and grossed a total of $411,549.

References

External links 
  
 
 
 

2008 films
Films directed by Kim Ki-duk
South Korean independent films
2000s Japanese-language films
2000s Korean-language films
South Korean mystery films
Showbox films
South Korean fantasy films
Films set in prison
Films about dreams
Films about suicide
2008 multilingual films
South Korean multilingual films
2000s South Korean films